San Martín Department is a  department of Corrientes Province in Argentina.

Settlements
Colonia Carlos Pellegrini
Guaviraví
La Cruz
Yapeyú

Departments of Corrientes Province